Mordellistena aequalica is a species of beetle in the genus Mordellistena of the family Mordellidae. It was discovered in 1963 and can be found in Italy and Switzerland.

References

alpicola
Beetles described in 1963
Beetles of Europe